Francisco Nunes Teixeira (26 January 1910 − 2 March 1999) was a Portuguese-born Mozambican Roman Catholic bishop.

Ordained to the priesthood in 1933, Teixeira was named bishop in February 1955. In May 1955, he was appointed bishop of the Roman Catholic Diocese of Quelimane, Mozambique and resigned in 1975.

References

1910 births
1999 deaths
People from Aveiro District
Portuguese Roman Catholic bishops in Africa
20th-century Roman Catholic bishops in Mozambique
Roman Catholic bishops of Quelimane